The 1922–23 Football League season was Birmingham Football Club's 27th in the Football League and their 10th in the First Division. They finished in 17th position in the 22-team division, and set an unwanted record sequence of eight league defeats, since equalled but  not beaten. They also competed in the 1922–23 FA Cup, entering at the first round proper and losing to Huddersfield Town in that round.

Twenty-six players made at least one appearance in nationally organised first-team competition, and there were ten different goalscorers. Full-back Jack Jones played in 41 matches over the 43-match season; goalkeeper Dan Tremelling and forward Joe Bradford appeared in one fewer. Bradford was leading scorer for the second year running, with 19 goals, of which 18 came in the league.

Off the field, the club made a £13,000 saving on wages and general expenses to end the season with a profit of £3,000. This was Frank Richards' last season as secretary-manager. He was succeeded by Billy Beer, who as a player made 250 appearances for the club in the 1900s.

Football League First Division

League table (part)

FA Cup

Appearances and goals

Players with name struck through and marked  left the club during the playing season.

See also
Birmingham City F.C. seasons

References
General
 Matthews, Tony (1995). Birmingham City: A Complete Record. Breedon Books (Derby). .
 Matthews, Tony (2010). Birmingham City: The Complete Record. DB Publishing (Derby). .
 Source for match dates and results: "Birmingham City 1922–1923: Results". Statto Organisation. Retrieved 18 May 2012.
 Source for lineups, appearances, goalscorers and attendances: Matthews (2010), Complete Record, pp. 286–87.
 Source for kit: "Birmingham City". Historical Kits. Dave Moor. Retrieved 12 May 2021.

Specific

Birmingham City F.C. seasons
Birmingham